Helmut Sauermilch (born 28 April 1933) is a West German rower who represented the United Team of Germany. He competed at the 1956 Summer Olympics in Melbourne with the men's coxless pair where they were eliminated in the semi-final.

References

1933 births
Living people
West German male rowers
Olympic rowers of the United Team of Germany
Rowers at the 1956 Summer Olympics
Sportspeople from Düsseldorf